Gordie Howe Bridge may refer to:

 Gordie Howe International Bridge, Detroit River crossing under construction between Detroit and Windsor
 Gordie Howe Bridge (Saskatoon), South Saskatchewan River crossing in Saskatoon